CEDA International aka Century  Entrepreneurship Development Agency is a Non-governmental organization based in Kampala, Uganda found by Rehmah Kasule. CEDA International Educates, Promote Leadership, Mentor and help with Entrepreneurship for women and youth (girls & boys) all over East Africa.

Partners 
CEDA International partners Uganda Telecom, Vital Voices Global Partnership, African Women's Development Fund, MacArthur Foundation, UNDEF, and UN-HABITAT.

Projects 
CEDA International Global Mentoring Walk 

YEP (Youth Engaged Program)

References

Non-profit organizations based in Africa
2013 establishments in Uganda